Max Reichmann (1884-1958) was a German film director active during the silent and early sound eras. Before making his own films, Reichmann worked as an assistant director on several E.A. Dupont productions. After graduating to directing, he directed the tenor Richard Tauber in several films following the introduction of sound in the late 1920s.

Reichmann was Jewish, and was therefore forced to go into exile in France when the Nazi Party took power in Germany in 1933. He later emigrated to the United States, where he died in 1958.

Selected filmography

Director
 The Battle Against Berlin (1926)
 Derby (1926)
 The Strange Case of Captain Ramper (1927)
 Knights of the Night (1928)
 Life's Circus (1928)
 Weib in Flammen (1928)
 Der Herzensphotograph (1928)
 Never Trust a Woman (1930)
 End of the Rainbow (1930)
 How Do I Become Rich and Happy? (1930)
 You'll Be in My Heart (1930)
 The Land of Smiles (1930)
 The Big Attraction (1931)
 Transit Camp (1932)

Screenwriter
 The Flower Girl of Potsdam Square (1925)

References

Bibliography
 Bock, Hans-Michael & Bergfelder, Tim. The Concise CineGraph. Encyclopedia of German Cinema. Berghahn Books, 2009.

External links

1884 births
1958 deaths
German film directors
Mass media people from Strasbourg
Jewish emigrants from Nazi Germany to the United States
People from Alsace-Lorraine